The following is an alphabetical list of members of the United States House of Representatives from the state of Wyoming.  For chronological tables of members of both houses of the United States Congress from the state (through the present day), see United States congressional delegations from Wyoming.  The list of names should be complete (as of January 3, 2015), but other data may be incomplete. It includes members who have represented both the state and the territory, both past and present.

Current member 
Updated January 3, 2023.
 : Harriet Hageman (R) (since 2023)

List of members and delegates

See also 

 United States congressional delegations from Wyoming
 List of United States senators from Wyoming
 Wyoming's at-large congressional district

References

External links 
 House of Representatives List of Members

 
Wyoming
United States Representatives